Byturus unicolor, known generally as raspberry fruitworm, is a species of fruitworm beetle in the family Byturidae. Other common names include the western raspberry fruitworm and fruitworm beetle. It is found in Central America and North America.

References

Further reading

 

Byturidae
Articles created by Qbugbot
Beetles described in 1823